The Carolinas tornado outbreak of March 28, 1984, was the most destructive tornado outbreak to sweep through the two states since another tornado outbreak struck 100 years and 1 month earlier, according to NOAA and NCDC public records.

Summary
On the evening of March 27, upper-air plots identified a broad and powerful upper-level trough exiting the southern Rocky Mountains into the Great Plains. In the mid-levels of the atmosphere, the trough detached into a cut-off low, while a potent shortwave trough rounded the base of this feature into the Gulf Coast of the United States. Within three hours, these moist dewpoints surged well into eastern North Carolina as the surface low pushed into southern Kentucky.

To the south of the original area of low pressure, a distinct mesolow developed along the warm front across northern Alabama. As it did so, low-level winds across the eastern Carolinas originated from a southerly direction instead of a southwesterly direction; this shift in flow created a strongly sheared environment across the region. Meanwhile, afternoon temperatures climbed above , contributing to significant destabilization. Convective available potential energy values rose between 2,000–3,000 J/kg into North Carolina, with locally higher values observed in northeastern South Carolina.

These environmental conditions bore strong resemblance to the idealized tornado setup across the Carolinas, and they prompted the SLSU to upgrade areas from eastern Alabama into the Outer Banks of North Carolina to a High risk of severe weather, the first occurrence on record in this portion of the United States. As the mesolow moved across the Carolinas, it was supported by a surface trough to its east-northeast which likely formed as a result of differential heating. Strong low-level convergence associated with this feature led to vigorous thunderstorm development in close proximity to the low, where low-level helicity was maximized and highly supportive of supercell thunderstorms. These supercells first began producing tornadoes across Upstate South Carolina around 19:15 UTC and continued to do so as they moved northeast, passing between Columbia and Charlotte around 22:00 UTC, near Fayetteville around 00:00 UTC on March 29, and finally ending north of the Albemarle Sound in northeastern North Carolina around 02:00 UTC. In total, 24 tornadoes were confirmed, with 11 each in the Carolinas and 2 in Georgia. The size and scope of the event drew parallels to the 1884 Enigma tornado outbreak and tornado outbreak on April 16, 2011, and it held the record for number of tornadoes in the Carolinas until that 2011 event. Comparisons were also drawn to the 1925 Tri-State tornado outbreak given the progression of an intense collection of tornadoes located near the mesolow.

Confirmed tornadoes

Aftermath
Ultimately this outbreak was responsible for 57 deaths, 1,249 injuries, and confirmed tornado damage in 2 counties in Georgia, 8 counties in South Carolina, and 17 counties in North Carolina, according to data from the National Weather Service and the National Climatic Data Center records and statistical data.

This was an unusual East Coast outbreak both in its sustained intensity and in some of its meteorological specifics. It was noted by Grazulis and other researchers that this outbreak developed near the center of a large-scale low, in a fashion resembling the 1925 Tri-State tornado. In this outbreak, the damage path was attributed to separate tornadoes, though one storm produced (on an estimated 250+ mile track) a family of 13 large tornadoes, 10 of which produced F3 or F4 damage, which was occasionally connected by swaths of downburst damage. The resulting tornado family, the series of tornadoes in totality is among the longest on record.

This outbreak was also part of a larger storm system that was responsible for producing severe weather across a much wider area of the eastern U.S.  On the previous day, weaker tornadoes had been reported in scattered locations from Louisiana to Alabama, and a thunderstorm-caused flash flood was suspected to be the cause of a train derailment in north Florida.  The northern part of the same system first spawned additional severe (non-tornadic) thunderstorms, which caused 4 additional deaths in Maryland and Pennsylvania, before then dropping snow, sleet and ice across a wide area of the northeast. The thunderstorms which produced the tornado outbreak were also responsible (according to the same data) for numerous reports of large hail and wind damage in Appalachian southwest North Carolina, and numerous larger cities (Atlanta, Baltimore, Greenville, South Carolina, Columbia, South Carolina, Charlotte, North Carolina, Dover, Delaware, Fayetteville, North Carolina, Philadelphia, Pittsburgh, Raleigh, North Carolina, Suffolk, Virginia, Norfolk, Virginia) at the periphery of the outbreak, with wind damage from thunderstorms reported as far north as Delaware.

See also
List of tornado outbreaks
List of North American tornadoes and tornado outbreaks
List of Storm Prediction Center high risk days
Tornado outbreak of April 14–16, 2011

Notes

References

 Grazulis, Thomas P. (2001). The Tornado. University of Oklahoma Press. p. 203.
 Fujita, T. T.; Stiegler, D. (1985). "Detailed analysis of the tornado outbreak in the Carolinas by using radar, satellite, and aerial survey data. Preprints". 14th Conference on Severe Local Storms, Indianapolis. American Meteorological Society. pp. 271–274.
 Kraft, Scott; Harper, Timothy (April 1, 1984). "Wreckage, victims tell tornado's tale on 450-mile route". Herald-American (Syracuse, New York). Associated Press. p. 16.

External links
 Full map of the 1984 Carolinas tornado outbreak.  Tornado History Project.
 Anniversary video focusing on the Red Springs tornado, including footage of damage done to the town.
 Second look at the Red Springs storm.
 Raleigh News & Observer 25th anniversary feature focusing on the Bennettsville and Red Springs storms.
 The Weather Channel blog post detailing the outbreak, with some meteorological information.

F4 tornadoes by date
Tornadoes of 1984
Tornadoes in Georgia (U.S. state)
Tornadoes in South Carolina
Tornadoes in North Carolina
1984 natural disasters in the United States
1984 in North Carolina
Carolinas tornado outbreak